Scott Fontaine is an American journalist. He has reported from Iraq, Kuwait, Tanzania, Rwanda and across the United States. He has appeared on Fox News, PBS and various local television and radio stations.

Fontaine worked as a reporter for Gannett newspapers, as a sports writer and news reporter at The News Tribune, the Albuquerque Journal, the St. Louis Post-Dispatch and the Columbia Missourian. His freelance work has appeared in newspapers and magazines in the United States, the United Kingdom and South Africa.

He was born and raised in a suburb of New Orleans and attended the University of Missouri. He lived in Cape Town for six months after college and traveled across sub-Saharan Africa for another six months.

Fontaine returned to the United States in 2005 and worked as a copy editor and sports writer at the Albuquerque Journal, New Mexico’s largest newspaper. He left the following year to work as a sports writer at The News Tribune of Tacoma, Wash. He later worked at the paper as a general-assignment news reporter and a military affairs reporter. He traveled to the Middle East twice to embed with local Army and Air Force units.

He married his wife, Liz, in 2008. They live in Alexandria, Va.

References

External links
Air Force Times web site
The News Tribune web site

People from Alexandria, Virginia
American male journalists
Living people
Year of birth missing (living people)
Journalists from Virginia